The 1947 International Cross Country Championships was held in Saint-Cloud, France, at the Hippodrome de Saint-Cloud on March 30, 1947.   A report on the event was given in the Glasgow Herald.

Complete results, medallists, 
 and the results of British athletes were published.

Medallists

Individual Race Results

Men's (9 mi / 14.5 km)

Team Results

Men's

Participation
An unofficial count yields the participation of 54 athletes from 6 countries.

 (9)
 (9)
 (9)
 (9)
 (9)
 (9)

See also
 1947 in athletics (track and field)

References

International Cross Country Championships
International Cross Country Championships
Cross
International Cross Country Championships
Cross country running in France